The Dean of the Chapel Royal, in any kingdom, can be the title of an official charged with oversight of that kingdom's chapel royal, the ecclesiastical establishment which is part of the royal household and ministers to it.

England
In England, the Dean of the Chapels Royal was appointed by royal warrant and appointed its officers and staff. The office of dean (dating from 1312) has been by custom held by the Bishop of London since 1748 ( or 1723, see below). In practice, the chapel, its choir, and the various chapel buildings associated with it come under the oversight of the Sub-Dean, who is the King's residential chaplain.

As in 2019 the Chapels Royal in England consisted of: The Queen’s Chapel; the Chapel Royal, St James’s Palace; the Chapel Royal, Hampton Court Palace; the Chapel of St Peter ad Vincula (Tower of London); the Chapel of St John the Evangelist (Tower of London); and The Queen's Chapel of the Savoy.

Office holders
Edward III (1327)
: John de Wodeford
: John de Leek
Richard II (1377)
: Thomas de Lynton (canon of Windsor, 1378–1387)
: John Boor (canon of Windsor, 1389–1402)
Henry IV (1399)
: Richard Kyngeston, Archdeacon of Hereford and canon of Windsor
: Richard Prentys, Archdeacon of West Ham and canon of Windsor
Henry V (1413)
1414: Edmund Lacey, canon of Windsor (became Bishop of Hereford, 1417)
1417–1432: Robert Gilbert (later Bishop of London, 1436)
Henry VI (1422)
1432–1438: Richard Praty (became Bishop of Chichester, 1438)
1438–1444: John Croucher, Dean of Chichester
1444–1449 (d.): Robert Ayscogh (possibly Robert Aiscough, later Archdeacon of Exeter) 
1449–1468 (d.): William Say, Dean of St Paul's from 1457 and Archdeacon of Northampton from 1464
Edward IV (1461);Henry VI (restored 1470)
1469–1470 (d.): Thomas Bonyfaunt
Edward IV (restored 1471)
: William Dudley, canon then Dean of Windsor (became Bishop of Durham)
1476: John Gunthorpe, Dean of Wells and, until 1478, Archdeacon of Essex
: William Chauntre, Archdeacon of Derby
Richard III (1483)
1483: William Beverley, Dean of Middleham, Yorkshire
Henry VII (1485)
: Richard Hill, Bishop of London
: Thomas Jane, Bishop of Norwich
1497-1501: Richard Nikke, Archdeacon of Wells (later Bishop of Norwich, 1501-1535)
: Geoffrey Simeon (later Dean of Lincoln)
1502: William Atwater, canon of Windsor 1504–1514, then Bishop of Lincoln
Henry VIII (1509); Edward VI (1547); Mary I (1553)
1514–1519: John Vesey (Bishop of Exeter, 1519-1551)
?1519–>1525: Richard Sampson, Archdeacon of Cornwall, 1517
1534–1558: Thomas Thirlby, Bishop of Westminster, 1540–1550
Elizabeth I (1558)
1558–1583: George Carew, Dean of Bristol
1583–1603: No appointment
James I (1603)
1603–1618: James Montague, Dean of Lichfield
1618–1626: Lancelot Andrewes, Bishop of Ely until 1619, then Bishop of Winchester
Charles I (1625)
1626: William Laud, Bishop of St David's until 1626, then Bishop of Bath and Wells until 1628, then Bishop of London until 1633, then Archbishop of Canterbury
1643–?1651: Richard Steward (Provost of Eton and Dean of St Paul's (but not installed), 1642–1651))
Commonwealth (1649)
Charles II (1660)
7 June 1660: Gilbert Sheldon, Bishop of London
2 October 1663: George Morley, Bishop of Winchester
7 February 1668: Herbert Croft, Bishop of Hereford
5 April 1669: Walter Blandford, Bishop of Oxford until 1671, then Bishop of Worcester
15 July 1675: Henry Compton, Bishop of London
James II (1685)
28 December 1685: Nathaniel Crew, Bishop of Durham
William III (1689)
20 September 1689: Henry Compton, Bishop of London (again)
Anne (1702)
17 July 1713: John Robinson, Bishop of Bristol until 1714, then Bishop of London
George I (1714)
15 March 1718: William Talbot, Bishop of Salisbury
George II (1727)
17 November 1721 – 1748: Edmund Gibson, Bishop of Lincoln until 1723, then Bishop of London
For deans after 1748 see Bishop of London
Elizabeth II (1952)
29 November 1995: Richard Chartres, Bishop of London
Following his 2017 retirement as Bishop of London, Richard Chartres remained as Dean while Sarah Mullally became accustomed to her various duties and responsibilities as Bishop of London; as such he assisted at the Baptism of Prince Louis on 9 July 2018 and the traditional Epiphany service at the Chapel Royal on 6 January 2019. Chartres retired as Dean of the Chapel Royal in July 2019.
12 July 2019: Sarah Mullally, Bishop of London

Sources

Scotland
In Scotland, the title first appears in the fifteenth century, when it may have referred to a prebend in the church of St Mary on the Rock, St Andrews.  In 1501 James IV founded a new Chapel Royal in Stirling Castle, but from 1504 onwards the deanery was held by successive Bishops of Galloway with the title of Bishop of the Chapel Royal and authority over all the royal palaces within Scotland.  The deanery was annexed to the bishopric of Dunblane in 1621, and the Chapel Royal was removed to Holyrood.

The office of Dean was suppressed with the abolition of prelacy in 1689, and the revenues of the Chapel Royal reverted to the Crown.  Grants from these revenues were made to individual Church of Scotland ministers and from 1727 onwards part was allocated to three royal chaplains, known collectively as the Deans of the Chapel Royal. Replacement of these chaplains by professors of the Divinity Faculties in the University of Glasgow, the University of Aberdeen, the University of Edinburgh and the University of St Andrews took place between 1860 and 1868.  In 1886 the office of Dean was revived and united by royal warrant to that of Dean of the Thistle, eventually being separated in 1969. Under the 1886 royal warrant, the Dean is also titular Abbot of Crossraguel and Abbot of Dundrennan.

Office holders since revival
1824-1841: William Bryce, minister of Aberdour
1887–1910: Cameron Lees, Minister of St Giles' Cathedral until 1906 and Dean of the Thistle
1910–1926: Wallace Williamson, Minister of St Giles' Cathedral and Dean of the Thistle
1926–1969: Charles Warr, Dean of the Thistle and sometime Minister of St Giles' Cathedral
1969–1973: James Longmuir, sometime Minister at Chirnside
1974–1981: Hugh Douglas, Minister at Dundee until 1977
1981–1991: Robin Barbour, New Testament professor, University of Aberdeen
1991–1996: William Morris, Minister of Glasgow Cathedral
1996–2006: James Harkness, Chaplain-in-Ordinary to the Queen
2006–2013: John Cairns, Minister at Riverside Parish Church, Dumbarton
2013–2019: Iain Torrance, Pro-Chancellor, University of Aberdeen, Chaplain-in-Ordinary to the Queen and Dean of the Thistle
2019–present: David Fergusson, Professor of Divinity, University of Edinburgh, Chaplain-in-Ordinary to the Queen and Dean of the Thistle

Ireland
The Chapel Royal (Irish: Séipéal Ríoga) in Dublin Castle was the official Church of Ireland chapel of the Household of the Lord Lieutenant of Ireland from 1814 until the creation of the Irish Free State in 1922. From 1831, the principal chaplain to the Lord Lieutenant was usually styled Dean of the Chapel Royal.

Office holders
1831–1843: Charles Vignoles, Dean of Ossory from 1843
1843–1860: Usher Tighe, Dean of Leighlin until 1854, then Dean of Ardagh until 1858 (became Dean of Derry)
1860–1866: Charles Graves, Dean of Clonfert from 1864 (became Bishop of Limerick, Ardfert and Aghadoe)
1866–1868: William Connor Magee, Dean of Cork (became Bishop of Peterborough)
1868–1905: Hercules Dickinson (died 1905)
1905–1913: Reginald Godfrey Michael Webster (Acting Dean from c. 1902)
1913–1922: Charles O'Hara Mease (died 1922)

References

See also

List of deans in the Church of England

Ecclesiastical Household

 01
.Chapel Royal
Positions within the British Royal Household
Anglican ecclesiastical offices
Ceremonial officers in the United Kingdom